Matías Nicolás Forlano (born 12 November 2001) is an Argentine professional footballer who plays as a midfielder for Huracán.

Career
Forlano joined Huracán from Racing Club in 2015. Five years later, in 2020, Forlano was promoted into Huracán's first-team squad under manager Sebastián Beccacece. He was selected on the substitute's bench for a Copa de la Liga Profesional match away to Boca Juniors on 27 December, with the midfielder subsequently making his senior debut after replacing Santiago Hezze with fourteen minutes remaining of a 3–0 loss.

Career statistics
.

Notes

References

External links

2001 births
Living people
Place of birth missing (living people)
Argentine footballers
Association football midfielders
Argentine Primera División players
Club Atlético Huracán footballers